Christian Tiboni (born 6 April 1988) is an Italian footballer who plays as a striker for S.S.D. San Nicolò Calcio.

Club career
Christian began his career at Atalanta as a youth player. Christian made one Serie B appearance for Atalanta during the 2005–2006 season, and his potential later persuaded Udinese to buy half of his contractual rights for the start of the 2006–2007 season. and exchanged with Fernando Tissone. His national youth team striking partner Salvatore Foti was also signed. He was successively loaned out to Pisa during the summer of 2007 transfer window, but failed to make a single appearance with the Tuscan side, being then loaned to Serie C1 team Sassuolo in January 2008. In June 2008 Atalanta re-signed him from Udinese and loaned him to Hellas Verona.

Tiboni went on trial to Ekstraklasa side Wisła Kraków in July 2010. Later he signed one-year loan contract + the option for another two for the Bulgarian side CSKA Sofia on 29 July 2010, becoming the fourth Italian player they signed that summer.

In mid-2017, Tiboni joined Serie D club S.C. Palazzolo. The contract was terminated in November 2017.

International career
On 12 August 2009 he was called up to the Italy U-21 national team for a friendly game against Russia. But he didn't play in this match.

Career statistics

Club
(Correct as of 20 September 2010)

References

External links
Associazione Italiana Calciatori 

 

1988 births
Living people
Italian footballers
Atalanta B.C. players
Udinese Calcio players
Hellas Verona F.C. players
U.S. Sassuolo Calcio players
Ascoli Calcio 1898 F.C. players
PFC CSKA Sofia players
Calcio Foggia 1920 players
Piacenza Calcio 1919 players
A.S.D. S.C. Palazzolo players
Association football forwards
Serie A players
Serie B players
First Professional Football League (Bulgaria) players
Expatriate footballers in Bulgaria
U.S. Agropoli 1921 players